RNA biology may refer to:
 For the scientific journal, see RNA Biology.
 For ribonucleic acid, see RNA.